Giuseppe Maria Maraviglia, C.R. (1617 – 19 September 1684) was a Roman Catholic prelate who served as Bishop of Novara (1667–1684).

Biography
Giuseppe Maria Maraviglia was born in Milan, Italy in 1617.
On 12 December 1667, during the papacy of Pope Clement IX, he was appointed Bishop of Novara.
On 18 December 1667, he was consecrated bishop by Benedetto Odescalchi, Cardinal-Priest of Sant'Onofrio, with Giacomo Altoviti, Titular Patriarch of Antioch, and Carlo Stefano Anastasio Ciceri, Bishop of Alessandria della Paglia, serving as co-consecrators. 
He served as Bishop of Novara until his death on 19 September 1684.

References

External links and additional sources
 (for Chronology of Bishops) 
 (for Chronology of Bishops) 

17th-century Italian Roman Catholic bishops
Bishops appointed by Pope Clement IX
1617 births
1684 deaths